ENK may refer to:
 Enkeltpersonforetak, a type of sole proprietorship in Norway
 Enkor, a defunct Russian airline
 Enniskillen/St Angelo Airport, in Northern Ireland